Pseudomyrophis is a genus of eels in the snake eel family Ophichthidae.  It currently contains the following species:

 Pseudomyrophis atlanticus Blache, 1975
 Pseudomyrophis frio (D. S. Jordan & B. M. Davis, 1891)
 Pseudomyrophis fugesae McCosker, E. B. Böhlke & J. E. Böhlke, 1989 (Diminutive worm-eel)
 Pseudomyrophis micropinna Wade, 1946 (Smallfin worm-eel)
 Pseudomyrophis nimius J. E. Böhlke, 1960

References

 

 
Ophichthidae